John de Lisle may refer to:

John de Lisle (constable), Constables and Governors of Windsor Castle
John de Lisle (cricketer), (1891–1961), Leicestershire cricket captain
Baron Lisle
John de Lisle, 1st Baron Lisle (d. 1304) 
John de Lisle, 2nd Baron Lisle (first creation) (1281–1337) (first creation 1299)
John de Lisle, 2nd Baron Lisle (second creation) (1318–1355) (second creation 1311), a companion of the future King Edward III of England, and one of the founders and eighth Knight of the Garter in 1348

See also
John Lisle (disambiguation)